Allmannsweiler is a municipality in the district of Biberach in Baden-Württemberg in Germany.

History
In 1803, Schussenried Abbey was secularized and its holdings mediatized to the County of Sternberg-Manderscheid. It was re-mediatized in 1806 to the Kingdom of Württemberg. Allmannsweiler was subsequently assigned to a new district, that of Biberach an der Riss.

Geography
It is located at the southern edge of the district's area, along the border with the district of Sigmaringen. Allmannsweiler is physically located in the basin of the Federsee. Elevation above sea level in the municipal area ranges from a high of  Normalnull (NN) to a low of  NN.

Culture
The architecture of Allmannsweiler is primarily made up of Baroque farmhouses and half-timber buildings. A notable edifice is the Gothic, 14th century Church of the Holy Cross, the local Roman Catholic parish church.

Politics
Allmannsweiler has one borough (Orsteil): Allmannsweiler.

Coat of arms
Allmannsweiler's coat of arms depicts a raised, golden cross upon a field of green. The cross is an image of the crucifix in the Church of the Holy Cross, and the green field references the agricultural character of the municipality's economy. This coat of arms was awarded along with a municipal flag by the Biberach district office on 23 March 1982.

Transportation
Allmannsweiler is only connected to Germany's network of roadways by its local Kreisstraßen. Local bus lines provide for public transportation.

References

External links

  (in German)

Biberach (district)
Württemberg